House arrest is the legal confinement of a person to his or her place of residence.

House Arrest may also refer to:

Film and television
 House Arrest (1996 film), an American comedy directed by Harry Winer
 House Arrest (2019 film), an Indian comedy directed by Shashanka Ghosh and Samit Basu
 House Arrest (2021 film), a Russian film
 House Arrest (TV series), a 2011–2013 Bulgarian sitcom
 "House Arrest" (M*A*S*H), a television episode
 "House Arrest" (The Sopranos), a television episode
 House Arrest with Andy Dick, a 2009 web series by Andy Dick
The House Arrest of Us, a 2020–2021 web series by Richard Arellano

Literature
 House Arrest, a 2000 play by Anna Deavere Smith
 House Arrest, a 2008 Hardy Boys novel in the Murder House Trilogy

Music
 House Arrest (album) or the title song, by Ariel Pink, 2002
 "House Arrest" (song), by Krush, 1987
 "House Arrest", a song by Bryan Adams from Waking Up the Neighbours, 1991
 "House Arrest", a song by Sofi Tukker and Gorgon City, 2020